Yoshimine-dera is a temple of the Tendai school of Buddhism in the western ward of Nishikyō-ku, in Kyoto. It is built on the western hills (Nishiyama) overlooking the city.

It was founded in 1029 by Gensan.

The main image is a statue of thousand-armed Kannon. Notable features include the "Gliding Dragon" pine tree (Yōryu no matsu, a natural monument), which was trained to grow horizontally and was once over 50 meters long, and a Tahōtō two-story pagoda (an Important Cultural Asset).

Yoshimine-dera is the twentieth temple on the Kansai Kannon Pilgrimage.

References

Buddhist temples in Kyoto
Important Cultural Properties of Japan